General elections were held in Guam in November 2000 in order to elect the Legislature, Guam's delegate to the United States House of Representatives, the Public Auditor (for the first time) and village mayor and vice-mayors.

Campaign
A total of 33 candidates contested the 15 seats in the Legislature (including 13 incumbents), two ran for the Delegate position and five for the Public Auditor.

In the Legislature elections, 32 candidates were from the Democratic or Republican parties, with one running as an independent.

Results

Legislature

Tom Ada received the most votes, and three women were elected.

Public Auditor
Doris Flores Brooks was elected with 51% of the vote.

Delegate

References

2000
2000
2000 Guam elections